Barraquito is a coffee liqueur commonly available on Tenerife (one of the Canary Islands), also known as zaperoco.

Etymology

Description
The barraquito is a multi-layered coffee liqueur drink (though non-liqueur versions are available) normally served in a glass to enable easy viewing of the different layers.

Ingredients
The layers of a barraquito are normally:
 Coffee
 Licor 43
 Frothed milk
 Condensed milk

Other ingredients typically used:
 Lemon peel
 Cinnamon

Preparation
The condensed milk is first added, followed by the liqueur, espresso and lemon peel (in this order).  Milk (can be frothed by any means available) is then added and cinnamon is sprinkled on top.

Regional variations
The barraquito is often known as a "zaperoco" in northern areas of Tenerife, it can be also spelled as “Saperoco”. In some places and menues, Barraquito is served without alcohol, while Zaperoco/Saperoco is served with alcohol.

References

External links

 

Coffee liqueurs
Canary Islands cuisine